Lillooet West was a provincial electoral district in the Canadian province of British Columbia. It was created from the division of the former two-member Lillooet into Lillooet East and Lillooet West, and appeared only in the 1894, 1898, and 1900 elections. For the 1894 election Lillooet East was redistributed into Kamloops and Cariboo-area ridings and Lillooet West was given the old Lillooet name, with both as one-member ridings.

Demographics

Electoral history

|- bgcolor="white"
!align="right" colspan=3|Total valid votes
!align="right"|97
!align="right"|100.00%
!align="right"|
|- bgcolor="white"
!align="right" colspan=3|Total rejected ballots
!align="right"|
!align="right"|
!align="right"|
|- bgcolor="white"
!align="right" colspan=7|The election was voided due to voting irregularities but Prentice sat for the first session. 
!align="right"|%
!align="right"|
!align="right"|
|}

|- bgcolor="white"
!align="right" colspan=3|Total valid votes
!align="right"|205
!align="right"|100.00%
!align="right"|
|- bgcolor="white"
!align="right" colspan=3|Total rejected ballots
!align="right"|
!align="right"|
!align="right"|
|- bgcolor="white"
!align="right" colspan=3|Turnout
!align="right"|%
!align="right"|
!align="right"|
|}

|Independent
|Robert B. Skinner
|align="right"|80
|align="right"|36.20%
|align="right"|
|align="right"|unknown

|- bgcolor="white"
!align="right" colspan=3|Total valid votes
!align="right"|221
!align="right"|100.00%
!align="right"|
|- bgcolor="white"
!align="right" colspan=3|Total rejected ballots
!align="right"|
!align="right"|
!align="right"|
|- bgcolor="white"
!align="right" colspan=3|Turnout
!align="right"|%
!align="right"|
!align="right"|
|}

References
Electoral History of BC 1871-1986, Elections BC

Former provincial electoral districts of British Columbia